is a railway station on the Nippō Main Line operated by Kyūshū Railway Company in Usa, Ōita, Japan.

History
The Hōshū Railway was acquired by the Kyushu Railway on 3 September 1901 and the Kyushu Railway was itself nationalised on 1 July 1907. Japanese Government Railways (JGR) designated the station as part of the Hōshū Main Line on 12 October 1909. Three days later, on  15 October 1909, the station was renamed Yanagigaura. JGR extended the track southwards from here to the present  on 21 December 1909. On 15 December 1923, the station became part of the Nippō Main Line. With the privatization of Japanese National Railways (JNR), the successor of JGR, on 1 April 1987, the station came under the control of JR Kyushu.

Passenger statistics
In fiscal 2016, the station was used by an average of 688 passengers daily (boarding passengers only), and it ranked 211th among the busiest stations of JR Kyushu.

References

External links

  

Railway stations in Ōita Prefecture
Railway stations in Japan opened in 1897